Harry Rose may refer to:

Harry M. Rose (1906–1986), microbiologist
Harry Rose (footballer) (1870–1946), English footballer
Harry Rose, character in Orchis Fatalis
Harry V. Rose, husband of Helen Rose
Harry Keller Rose, director of Rose of Cimarron
Harry Rose, lyricist of "Kitty from Kansas City"

See also
Henry Rose (disambiguation)
Harold Rose (1900–1990), English footballer and football manager
Harold Rose (economist) (1923–2018), English economist